Homalothecium is a genus of mosses belonging to the family Brachytheciaceae.

Species
The following species are recognised:

Homalothecium aequatoriense 
Homalothecium afrostriatum 
Homalothecium aplocladum 
Homalothecium appressifolium 
Homalothecium arenarium 
Homalothecium aureum 
Homalothecium californicum 
Homalothecium congestum 
Homalothecium decorum 
Homalothecium euchloron 
Homalothecium fulgescens 
Homalothecium gracillimum 
Homalothecium incompletum 
Homalothecium integerrimum 
Homalothecium laevisetum 
Homalothecium leucodonticaule 
Homalothecium longicuspis 
Homalothecium luteolum 
Homalothecium lutescens 
Homalothecium mandonii 
Homalothecium meridionale 
Homalothecium neckeroides 
Homalothecium nevadense 
Homalothecium nuttallii 
Homalothecium philippeanum 
Homalothecium pseudosericeum 
Homalothecium sericeum 
Homalothecium subcapillatum 
Homalothecium tenerrimum

References

Hypnales
Moss genera